Caliadne (Ancient Greek: Καλιάδνης ) or Caliadna, in Greek mythology, was a naiad of the river Nile, presumably one of the daughters of the river-god Nilus. She was one of the wives of King Aegyptus of Egypt, bearing him twelve sons: Eurylochus, Phantes, Peristhenes, Hermus, Dryas, Potamon, Cisseus, Lixus, Imbrus, Bromios, Polyctor, and Chthonios. These sons married and were murdered by the daughters of her sister Polyxo and King Danaus of Libya during their wedding night.

According to Hippostratus, Aegyptus had his progeny by a single woman called Eurryroe, daughter of the river-god Nilus. In some accounts, he consorted with his cousin Isaie, daughter of Agenor, king of Tyre.

Notes

References 

 Apollodorus, The Library with an English Translation by Sir James George Frazer, F.B.A., F.R.S. in 2 Volumes, Cambridge, MA, Harvard University Press; London, William Heinemann Ltd. 1921. . Online version at the Perseus Digital Library. Greek text available from the same website.
Tzetzes, John, Book of Histories, Book VII-VIII translated by Vasiliki Dogani from the original Greek of T. Kiessling's edition of 1826. Online version at theio.com

Naiads
Children of Nilus
Egyptian characters in Greek mythology